Nuno Borges and Francisco Cabral were the defending champions but chose not to defend their title.

Patrik Niklas-Salminen and Bart Stevens won the title after defeating Ruben Gonzales and Fernando Romboli 6–3, 6–4 in the final.

Seeds

Draw

References

External links
 Main draw

Bahrain Ministry of Interior Tennis Challenger - Doubles